Chichester Fortescue may refer to:

Chichester Fortescue (1718–1757), MP for Trim
Chichester Fortescue (1750–1820), Admiral and MP for Trim, son of the above
Chichester Fortescue (1777–1826), MP for Hillsborough, nephew of the above
Chichester Parkinson-Fortescue, 1st Baron Carlingford (1823–1898), Liberal politician, son of the above

See also
Fortescue (surname)